Toni Järvinen (born 27 January 1981) is a Finnish footballer who last played for Tampere United. He plays either as a midfielder or a side defender. Järvinen's junior team was Kuusysi Lahti and he has also played for FC Lahti in the Finnish premier division Veikkausliiga. As of September 2010 he has played 167 matches and scored 11 goals in the premier division. On 24 September 2010 he announced his retirement from the game because he never recovered from his injuries.

References

Finnish footballers
Finland B international footballers
1981 births
Living people
Veikkausliiga players
FC Lahti players
Tampere United players
Association football defenders
Association football midfielders
Sportspeople from Lahti